Columbia Gorge Regional Airport , also referred to as The Dalles Municipal Airport, is a public use airport in Klickitat County in the U.S. state of Washington. It is located near Dallesport, Washington and two nautical miles (4 km) northeast of the city of The Dalles in the state of Oregon. The airport is jointly owned by the city of The Dalles and Klickitat County. It is adjacent to the Columbia River, near the east end of the Columbia River Gorge National Scenic Area. This airport is included in the National Plan of Integrated Airport Systems for 2011–2015, which categorized it as a general aviation facility.

History
During the Great Depression, the city was granted $12,000 by the Works Progress Administration (WPA), but that was later revoked in 1935 when the WPA learned the city only leased the airport.

During reconstruction of the original runway 12/30, the runway was renumbered to the current 13/31 designation.  The Earth's magnetic north pole moves continuously, and when the original runway was constructed the magnetic headings were approximately 120 and 300.  Magnetic north drifted over the life of the runway, such that by the time it was due for reconstruction, the magnetic headings were closer to 130 and 310.

Facilities and aircraft 
The airport covers an area of 997 acres (403 ha) at an elevation of 247 feet (75 m) above mean sea level. It has two runways with asphalt surfaces: 12/30 is 5,097 by 100 feet (1,554 x 30 m) and 7/25 is 4,647 by 100 feet (1,416 x 30 m).

For the 12-month period ending September 8, 2010, the airport had 16,282 aircraft operations, an average of 44 per day: 84% general aviation, 11% air taxi, and 5% military. At that time there were 58 aircraft based at this airport: 98% single-engine and 2% helicopter.

References

External links 
 Columbia Gorge Airport, official site
 The Dalles Municipal Airport at Washington State DOT
 Aerial image as of July 1996 from USGS The National Map
 

Airports in Washington (state)
Transportation buildings and structures in Klickitat County, Washington
Buildings and structures in The Dalles, Oregon
Columbia River Gorge